Birendra Kumar Kanodia is a Nepalese politician and member of the Lumbini Provincial Assembly.   He was elected as parliamentary party leader. He is the current leader of the opposition of Lumbini Province.

Politicial career
He was elected to the Pratinidhi Sabha in the 1999 election on behalf of the Nepali Congress. In 2001 he was appointed as Assistant Minister for Water Resources in Sher Bahadur Deuba's expanded cabinet.
Recently he was elected in a provincial election as a MLA from Kapilvastu constituency 3 sub-constituency 2.

Electoral history

2017 Nepalese provincial elections

1999 legislative elections

References

Government ministers of Nepal
Living people
Nepali Congress politicians from Lumbini Province
Year of birth missing (living people)
Members of the Provincial Assembly of Lumbini Province
Nepal MPs 1999–2002